The Social Life of Small Urban Spaces is a 1980 book by sociologist William H. Whyte.

In 1988 Whyte also published a video documentary with the same title as the 1980 book and another follow up book, the City: Rediscovering the Center.

See also 
 Project for Public Spaces

References 

1980 non-fiction books
Books about urbanism
Sociology books
Urban sociology
English-language books